Vladykino is a station on the Serpukhovsko–Timiryazevskaya line of the Moscow Metro.
The station provides transfer to Vladykino station on the Moscow Central Circle.

External links 
 metro.ru

Moscow Metro stations
Railway stations in Russia opened in 1991
Serpukhovsko-Timiryazevskaya Line
Railway stations located underground in Russia